Sky Sports Football Quiz is a 2001 football quiz video game released for the PlayStation and Windows. The game was developed by Hothouse Creations and published by THQ. It is the first game in the Sky Sports Football Quiz series.

Gameplay 
Sky Sports Football Quiz is a quiz game that tests the player's knowledge of football. The game features then Sky Sports presenter Kirsty Gallacher in the role of quizmaster and has a database of over 4,500 questions.

The player is able to choose between four modes: Penalty Shootout, where the player has to answer questions correctly to score goals, Man of the Match where the player/players take turns attacking and defending by answering questions, League Championship, where the player plays the game throughout an entire football season and Dream Team.

Reception 
Dave Woods of PC Zone awarded the game a score of 78%, comparing it favourably to Championship Manager Quiz, arguing that it had "better graphics, easier questions and more game formats", but criticised it for the "cardinal sin of repeating questions". Official PlayStation Magazine described the title as "a treat for stat-happy football freaks", giving a score of 7/10.

References 

2001 video games
Europe-exclusive video games
PlayStation (console) games
Quiz video games
THQ games
Video games developed in the United Kingdom
Windows games
Hothouse Creations games